Eduard Mohr (29 June 1902 – 20 September 1984) was a German sailor who competed in the 1936 Summer Olympics.

References

1902 births
1984 deaths
German male sailors (sport)
Olympic sailors of Germany
Sailors at the 1936 Summer Olympics – 8 Metre
Olympic bronze medalists for Germany
Olympic medalists in sailing
Medalists at the 1936 Summer Olympics